Cornel Feruță (born 21 August 1975) is a Romanian diplomat. From 25 July 2019 to December 2019 he was acting Director General of the International Atomic Energy Agency (IAEA) in Vienna.

References 

1975 births
Living people
Romanian diplomats
21st-century Romanian politicians
Directors General of the International Atomic Energy Agency
People associated with nuclear power
Romanian officials of the United Nations